Secret Recipe Cakes and Café Sdn Bhd (doing business as Secret Recipe) is a Malaysian halal-certified café chain company established since 1997. It has international branches in Singapore, Indonesia, Thailand, China, Brunei, Cambodia, Myanmar, Maldives and Bangladesh. It serves cakes and fusion food in a service environment.

As a leading and largest café chain in Malaysia with Halal-certification awarded by Jabatan Kemajuan Islam Malaysia (JAKIM), Secret Recipe is committed to continuing to adhere to the standards of preparation of all food and processing plants in the restaurant following the regulatory guidelines, including HACCP and VHM guidelines.

History
Founded in 1997, the company has registered double digit growth for the past five years. On 15 February 2014, Fosun International, a Chinese investment company invested a total of RMB210.5 million ($30.7 million) in Secret Recipe, thus becoming the second largest shareholder in the company.

Locations
Since its establishment, Secret Recipe has expanded to over 440 cafés throughout Asia: The company opened branches in Australia, but due to the high costs of starting up a franchise, the operation was ceased. Secret Recipe also plans to enter the India and New Zealand markets in the future.
Asia

 Malaysia (1997)
 Singapore (1999)
 Indonesia (2003)

 Thailand (2004)
 China (2007)
 Brunei (2009)

 Cambodia (2013)
 Myanmar (2015)
 Maldives (2016)
 Bangladesh (2017)
 United States (2022)

See also
 List of coffeehouse chains

References

External links
 

1997 establishments in Malaysia
Restaurants established in 1997
Restaurants in Malaysia
Fast-food franchises
Bakeries of Malaysia
Privately held companies of Malaysia
Halal restaurants
Malaysian cuisine
Malaysian brands
Companies based in Kuala Lumpur
Food and drink companies of Malaysia
Food and drink companies established in 1997